"Harlem Desire" is a single by Europop duo London Boys. It was originally released in 1987 to limited success. As a result of the success of "Requiem" and "London Nights", the single was released again in 1989 and featured on the album The Twelve Commandments of Dance. It was written and produced by Ralf René Maué, and its cover artwork features photography from Julian Barton. The single peaked at #17 in the UK.

The B-side "Talk! Talk! Talk!" is a distant reworking of the track "Dance Dance Dance" which also appeared on The Twelve Commandments of Dance and was released as a 1987 single. The original 1987 release featured the track "Put a Meaning in my Life" which was written by Django Seelenmeyer and Ralf René Maué.

Formats

1987 
7" Single
"Harlem Desire" - 3:45
"Put A Meaning In My Life" - 3:40

12" Single
"Harlem Desire (Extended Mix)" - 8:18
"Put A Meaning In My Life" - 3:40

1989 
7" Single
"Harlem Desire" - 3:41
"Talk! Talk! Talk!" - 3:20

12" Single
"Harlem Desire (Extended Mix)" - 8:21
"Talk! Talk! Talk!" - 3:20

CD Single
"Harlem Desire" - 3:44
"Talk! Talk! Talk!" - 3:20
"Harlem Desire (Extended Mix)" - 8:20
"Kimbaley (My Ma-Mama Say)" - 4:14

Chart performance

Personnel 
 Edem Ephraim - vocals
 Dennis Fuller - choreographer, backing vocals
 Ralf René Maué - writer, producer

References 

1989 singles
London Boys songs
Songs written by Ralf René Maué
1989 songs
Warner Music Group singles
Teldec singles